Rob Carlton (born 4 May 1971) is a Logie Award winning Australian actor and writer. He is best known for writing and starring in the comedy series Chandon Pictures. He also had starring roles in the comedy satire The Hollowmen and the children's television series Ocean Star.

Career 
Carlton has been a professional actor since the age of 14 and has appeared in many television series from Young Ramsay to A Country Practice, Home and away, Blue Heelers, Water Rats, Fireflies, McLeod's Daughters and All Saints. He has also appeared in many movies including Emu Runner, Strange Bedfellows, You Can't Stop the Murders and The Year My Voice Broke. Carlton trained with the Australian Theatre for Young People in Sydney, Australia for many years learning the foundations of acting for screen and stage.

In the mid-1990s, Carlton was living in Los Angeles. He accepted the role of continuity coordinator for an Australian film in Melbourne.

Carlton starred in the short film Carmichael & Shane, which was the winner of Tropfest in 2006. He also wrote, co-produced and co-directed the film. He co-starred with his real-life twin sons Jim and Leo Carlton, who played the title characters Carmichael and Shane. Carlton also won the award for Best Male Actor.

In April 2011, Carlton starred in the Australian Broadcasting Corporation's Paper Giants: The Birth of Cleo as the acerbic and charismatic king of Australian media, Kerry Packer. The mini-series rated strongly over two nights on 17 and 18 April 2011 and Carlton's performance, along with co-star Asher Keddie as Ita Buttrose, was well received by audiences and critics alike. In April 2012, Carlton won a Silver Logie Award for his performance in the role.

Carlton is also a professional speaker, who has worked as a master of ceremonies, compère, facilitator and motivational speaker.

Carlton had a supporting role in the 2012 Australian comedy Any Questions for Ben?, created by Working Dog Productions.

Carlton plays a role in the TV series Conspiracy 365.

Personal life 
Carlton is married to Adrienne Ferreira, an author, who wrote the book Watercolours. The couple lives in Avoca Beach, New South Wales with their twin sons, Jim and Leo Carlton.

Carlton spent some of his early years on Sydney's Northern Beaches, and attended Mona Vale Public School.

References

External links

 

Australian male film actors
Australian male television actors
Living people
Logie Award winners
1971 births